Ngawa or Aba town ( Burmese: ငါဝမြို့,  Standard Tibetan: Ngawa) is the seat of Ngawa (Aba) County, within the Ngawa (Aba) Tibetan and Qiang Autonomous Prefecture in northwestern Sichuan, China.

Ngawa (Aba) County has 70,000 inhabitants, about 8,000 of them Tibetan Buddhist monks, and others are Tibetan Buddhist nuns. The city has about 20,000 people. There are 37 monasteries and nunneries in the area, two of the largest in Aba City itself. There are mainly grasslands and forested valleys in the south.

Culture
Aba County is mainly inhabited by Tibetans. The major festivals are:

Great Prayer Festival: January 8 to January 15 according to the Tibetan calendar
Six-Four Festival: June 11 to June 17 according to the Tibetan calendar
Zachong Festival: September 15 to September 17 according to the lunar calendar
Horse Race Festival: Middle of July according to the lunar calendar

Monasteries and Nunneries
 Kirti Gompa, (sometimes referred to as Gerdeng Monastery), properly known as Kirti Kalari Gon Tashi Lhundrub, is a Gelugpa monastery on the northwestern edge of the town. It was founded in 1472 by Rongpa Chenakpa, a disciple of Tsongkhapa, and now houses about 2,500 monks.
 Nangzhik Gompa and Topgyel are both Bon monasteries are just northeast of the town. There are between 800 and 1000 affiliated monks.
 Setenling Gompa is a Buddhist monastery of the Jonangpa tradition about a kilometre from the eastern end of the town. It was founded by Namnang Dorje in the 13th-14th centuries, and reconstituted in the late 19th century by Dro-ge Yonten Gyatso. There are about 800 or 1000 affiliated monks.
 Mani Nunnery
 Dragkar Nunnery

"There are many monasteries scattered around the town, and they are all worth visiting."

Transport
Aba County is well connected to many provincial towns and cities. Aba is the biggest transport hub within the prefecture. There are long haul buses heading for Aba from Chengdu City, Mianyang City, Songpan County, Ma'er Kang County, Jinchuan County, Wenchuan County, Hongyuan County, Heishui County and Xiangtang County daily.

Attractions
Jiuzhaigou Valley - National Park
Huanglong Valley - scenic spot very close by
Wolong Nature Reserve - China's largest natural habitat for giant pandas
Miyaluo - scenic spot
Shrine honoring Rapten Tinley.

See also
Self-immolation protests by Tibetans in China

Footnotes

References
 Dorje, Gyurme (2009). Footprint Tibet Handbook. Footprint Books. .
 Kotan Publishing (2000). Mapping the Tibetan World. Kotan Publishing, 2004 reprint. .
 Mayhew, Bradley and Kohn, Michael. (2005). Tibet (6th edition). Lonely Planet publications. .

External links
Jiuzhai Valley National Park (Jiuzhaigou) 

Towns in Sichuan
Ngawa Tibetan and Qiang Autonomous Prefecture